Hippobosca is a genus of flies in the family Hippoboscidae. There are seven known species. There are numerous synonyms.

Distribution
The primary distribution is in Europe and parts of Asia and Africa. It has been introduced to other locations, though in some cases later eradicated by modern husbandry practices.

Species
Genus Hippobosca Linnaeus, 1758
Species group 'a'
H. equina Linnaeus, 1758
H. fulva Austen, 1912
H. longipennis Fabricius, 1805
Species group 'b'
H. camelina Leach, 1817
Species group 'c'
H. hirsuta Austen, 1911
H. rufipes von Olfers, 1816
H. variegata Megerle, 1803

References

External links 

Parasitic flies
Hippoboscidae
Hippoboscoidea genera
Taxa named by Carl Linnaeus